The Office of State Protection (Polish: Urząd Ochrony Państwa (UOP)) was the intelligence agency of Poland from 1990 to 2002, when it was split into two new agencies.

Foundation
The UOP was founded on 6 April 1990 as a department of the Ministry of Internal Affairs. Krzysztof Kozłowski served as the UOP's first chief from 1990 to 1992. In 1996 UOP was transformed into a separate government agency under the supervision of the prime minister. It was responsible for intelligence, counter-intelligence and government electronic security, including telephone wiretaps.

Reasons for formation
The UOP replaced the communist-era Służba Bezpieczeństwa (SB), I Departament People's Republic of Poland Ministry of Internal Affairs – intelligence, II Departament People's Republic of Poland Ministry of Internal Affairs – counter-intelligence, whose responsibilities had additionally included the suppression of opposition to the government prior to 1989.

Agency split
In June 2002, the agency was split into two separate entities – Agencja Bezpieczeństwa Wewnętrznego (Internal Security Agency), which deals with internal security of the country, and Agencja Wywiadu (Intelligence Agency), which deals with foreign intelligence.

Chiefs 
 Krzysztof Kozłowski (1990 – 1990)
 Andrzej Milczanowski (1990 – 1992)
 Piotr Naimski (1992)
 Andrzej Milczanowski (1992)
 Jerzy Konieczny (1992 – 1993)
 Gromosław Czempiński (1993 – 1996)
 Andrzej Kapkowski, p.o. szefa UOP (1996 – 1996)
 Andrzej Kapkowski (1996 – 1997)
 Jerzy Nóżka, p.o. szefa UOP (1997 – 1998)
 Zbigniew Nowek (1998 – 2001)
 Zbigniew Siemiątkowski, p.o. szefa UOP (2001 – 2002)
 Andrzej Barcikowski (2002)

See also
Instruction UOP nr 0015/92

References

External links
Agencja Bezpieczeństwa Wewnętrznego homepage

1990 establishments in Poland
2002 disestablishments in Poland
Defunct Polish intelligence agencies